Oh Yeon-ah (born Kim Mi-ae on December 1, 1981) is a South Korean actress. She has played many supporting roles in both films and television series.

Filmography

Films

Television series

Web series

Variety show

Awards and nominations

References

External links
 

1981 births
Living people
People from Seoul
21st-century South Korean actresses
South Korean film actresses
South Korean television actresses